Andelfingen is a small village in the south of Germany, in the municipality of Langenenslingen, in the district Biberach. It has a population of 1200.

Towns in Baden-Württemberg